Kléber Haye (26 April 1937 – 4 January 2023) was a French engineer and politician of the Socialist Party (PS).

Biography

Education and early career
Haye earned an agrégation in physics from the University of Bordeaux and a doctorate in electronic sciences from the École nationale supérieure d'électronique, informatique, télécommunications, mathématique et mécanique de Bordeaux.

Political career
Haye served as deputy mayor of Villenave-d'Ornon from 1977 to 1983 and also served as secretary-general of the Fédération socialiste de Gironde. In 1981, he was elected to the National Assembly from Gironde's 7th constituency, succeeding fellow socialist Pierre Lataillade. His mandate ended in 1986.

Also in 1981, Haye was elected to the Regional Council of Aquitaine, where he served until 1998.

Death
Kléber Haye died on 4 January 2023, at the age of 85.

References

1937 births
2023 deaths
Socialist Party (France) politicians
Deputies of the 7th National Assembly of the French Fifth Republic
Academic staff of the University of Bordeaux
People from Deux-Sèvres